Bobby Tarantino III is the seventh mixtape by American rapper Logic. It was released on July 30, 2021, through Def Jam Recordings and Visionary Music Group. The mixtape features a sole guest appearance from English actress and singer-songwriter Cynthia Erivo, who is featured on the sixth track, "Inside". It serves as the third and final installment to Logic's Bobby Tarantino mixtape trilogy. It also serves as his second project of 2021, following the release of his debut compilation album, YS Collection Vol. 1. The mixtape was preceded by four singles: "Vaccine", "Get Up", "My Way", and "Call Me".

Background
The mixtape serves as the third and final installment to Logic's Bobby Tarantino mixtape trilogy. The first installment was released in 2016 and the second installment was released in 2018. The cover art was created by Sam Spratt, who has created previous album and single cover arts for Logic. It shows a zombie escaping a burning car.

Release and promotion
On July 2, 2021, Logic released the single "Vaccine", in which he rapped, "Ready to fuck up the game, BT3, now we at it again, man", teasing the release of Bobby Tarantino III. After the song was released, he also tweeted about the existence of the mixtape. He revealed the release date and cover art on July 26, 2021.

Singles
Logic released the mixtape's lead single, "Vaccine", on July 2, 2021. Exactly one week later, on July 9, 2021, he followed it up with the second single, "Get Up". The third single, "My Way", was released on July 16, 2021. Finally, the fourth and final single, "Call Me", was released on July 23, 2021, exactly one week prior to the release of the mixtape. Each single was released one week after each other and were released every Friday of July in order, with the mixtape being released the final Friday.

Critical reception

Writing for This Song Is Sick, Austin Miller felt that with "kinetic tracks" that "keep the energy turned up with dynamic beats and feverish verses", such as "Vaccine", "God Might Judge", and "See You Space Cowboy", and songs that "float through a smoother current", like "Get Up" and "Call Me", "Logic's masterful lyricism and limitless flow run the gamut of brutal self-honesty to supportive optimism, all without any signs that this project is anything less than some of his best work yet".

Track listing

Notes
 "Introll" and "Untitled" are stylized in all lowercase.
 "Call Me" features background vocals from Dwn2earth.
 "God Might Judge" contains samples from "U Send Me Swingin'", performed by Mint Condition.

Personnel
 Bobby Campbell – mixing engineer, recording engineer, studio personnel 
 Dave Kutch – mastering engineer, studio personnel 
 Kyle Metcalfe – recording engineer, studio personnel 
 Coop the Truth – keyboards 
 Kory Fernie – keyboards 
 Justin Zim – guitar 
 FnZ
 Finatik – keyboards 
 Zac – keyboards

Charts

References

2021 mixtape albums
Logic (rapper) albums
Def Jam Recordings albums
Albums produced by FnZ
Sequel albums